Bungle Shama Rao Dwarakanath (born 19 August 1942), better known as Dwarakish, is an Indian actor, director and producer in the Kannada film industry. He was given the name Dwarakish by Kannada film maker C. V. Shivashankar.

Early life
Dwarakish was born on 19 August 1942. He grew up in Ittigegud, Mysore. He received his primary education in Sharada Vilas and Banumaiah's school, and he graduated from CPC Polytechnic with a Diploma in Mechanical Engineering. After completing his education, Dwarakish and his brother started an automotive spare-parts business called "Bharath Auto Spares" in Gandhi Square, Mysore. He was strongly attracted to acting and often asked his maternal uncle, a famous cinema director Hunusur Krishnamurthy, to give him a chance to act in movies. In 1963, he decided to quit business and start acting in movies.

Film career
In 1966, Dwarakish co-produced the movie Mamatheya Bandhana with 2 others under the banner of Thunga Pictures. In 1969, his first independent production Mayor Muthanna starring Dr.Rajkumar and Bharathi in the lead roles was a box office success. After Mayor Muthanna, Dwarakish gave a series of box office successes to Kannada cinema, one after the other for the next two decades.

Director
From the year 1985, Dwarakish started directing movies; his first movie as a director was Nee Bareda Kadambari. He went on to direct movies for other producers. Behind the camera, Dwarakish was successful. As a director, he created movies such as Dance Raja Dance, Nee Bareda Kadambari, Shruthi, Shruthi Haakidha Hejje, Rayaru Bandaru Mavana Manege and Kilaadigalu

Dwarakish Chitra faced problems after the failure of some movies. With huge losses from box office failures, Dwarakish was written off by his own colleagues and the entire film industry. Despite failures, Dwarakish did not despair. He continued to make movies introducing new faces to Kannada cinema.

As a producer, he has brought many new people to the cinema. Not only actors and actresses—he has given opportunities to new directors and other technicians. They all consider him to be their "Godfather". The support of these people, and his unwavering dedication to cinema, gave Dwarakish his long-awaited moment of success. Dwarakish produced Apthamitra in the year 2004. Apthamitra was a magnificent success.

Actor

He was the first Kannada producer to bring Kishore Kumar to the Kannada film Industry, and the song Aadu Aata Aadu became extremely popular.

Records and awards
Produced First Kannada movie to be shot outside India.
Apthamitra created records in Kannada Cinema. It was the first Kannada movie to celebrate screening for one year in two theatres, at Santosh in Bangalore and at Ranajith in Mysore and was the first Kannada movie to successfully complete one year of screening with four shows daily. 

He had received NTR Award

Filmography

As director and producer

As actor 

 Veera Sankalpa (1964)
 Maduve Madi Nodu(1965)
 Satya Harishchandra (1965)
 Sri Kanyaka Parameshwari Kathe (1966)
 Sri Purandara Dasaru (1967)
 Dhana Pishachi (1967)
 Lagna Pathrike (1967)
 Bhagyada Bagilu (1968)
 Adda Dari (1968)
 Manku Dinne (1968)
 Bedi Bandavalu (1968)
 Gandhinagara (1968)
 Jedara Bale (1968)
 Mayor Muthanna (1969)
 Mallammana Pavaada (1969)
 Arishina Kumkuma (1970)
 Baalu Belagithu (1970)
 Sidila Mari (1971)
 Sri Krishna Rukmini Satyabhama (1971)
 Bhale Adrushtavo Adrushta (1971)
 Thayi Devaru (1971)
 Nyayave Devaru (1971)
 Baala Bandana (1971)
 Nanda Gokula (1972)
 Janma Rahasya (1972)
 Kranti Veera (1972)
 Bangaarada Manushya (1972)
 Kulla Agent 000 (1972)
 CID 72 (1973)
 Devaru Kotta Thangi (1973)
 Professor Huchuraya (1974)
 Mahadeshwara Pooja Phala (1974)
 Maga Mommaga (1974)
 Anna Attige (1974)
 Bhakta Kumbara (1974)
 Kalla Kulla (1975)
 Makkala Bhagya (1976)
 Devara Duddu (1976)
 Bahaddur Gandu (1976)
 Pavana Ganga (1977)
 Sose Tanda Soubhagya (1977)
 Kittu Puttu (1977)
 Dhanalakshmi (1977)
 Bhagyavantharu (1977)
 Galate Samsara (1977)
 Shrimanthana Magalu (1977)
 Singaporenalli Raja Kulla (1978)
 Bhale Huduga (1978)
 Maathu Tappada Maga (1978)
 Madhura Sangama (1978)
 Bengaluru Bootha (1979)
 Asadhya Aliya (1979)
 Naniruvude Ninagagi (1979)
 Mane Mane Kathe (1980)
 Haddina Kannu (1980)
 Auto Raja (1980)
 Simhada Mari Sainya (1981)
 Kula Puthra (1981)
 Avala Hejje (1981)
 Guru Shishyaru (1981)
 Garjane (1981)
 Pedda Gedda (1982)
 Karmika Kallanalla (1982)
 Jimmy Gallu (1982)
 Prachanda Kulla (1984)
 Madhuve Madu Tamashe Nodu (1984)
 Indina Ramayana (1984)
 Nee Bareda Kadambari (1985)
 Nee Thanda Kanike (1985)
 Africadalli Sheela (1986)
 Dance Raja Dance (1987)
 Hendthi Helidare Kelabeku (1993)
 Server Somanna (1993)
 Muddina Maava (1993)
 Rayaru Bandaru Mavana Manege (1993)
 Mandyada Gandu (1994)
 Kiladigalu (1994)
 Rasika (1994)
 Khushi (2003)
Shwetha Naagara (2004)
 Apthamitra (2004)
 Jothe Jotheyali (2006)
 Josh (2009)
 Vishnuvardhana (2011)
 Maanikya (2014)
 Aatagara (2015)

References

External links
 Official site
 S 
 ify interview
 

Living people
Male actors from Karnataka
Male actors in Kannada cinema
Kannada film directors
Film producers from Karnataka
People from Mysore district
Film directors from Karnataka
20th-century Indian male actors
21st-century Indian male actors
20th-century Indian film directors
21st-century Indian film directors
Kannada film producers
Tamil film producers
Indian male film actors
Indian male comedians
Kannada comedians
1942 births
Recipients of the Rajyotsava Award 2006
Madhva Brahmins